Master of Illusion is the fourth studio album of the British power metal band Power Quest, which was recorded in from August–December 2007, released in Australia on 31 January 2008, in Japan on 11 March 2008, and has been released worldwide on 25 April 2008.

The album has been described as having "catchy melodies, fast paced songs, mid paced songs, epic songs" and will have a "hard rock" sound with "power ballads" and "heavier guitar work".

In December 2007, band keyboardist Steve Williams has announced on the Official Power Quest forums that there would be five guest appearances on the forthcoming album. The first of these was announced as guitarist Bill Hudson from North American power metal band Cellador, who will be providing guest instrumentation on the track "The Vigil".  The second of these was announced as keyboardist Richard West from British progressive metal band Threshold, who will be providing a keyboard solo on the track "Human Machine". The third has been revealed as Jorn Viggo Lofstad, from Norwegian progpower metal band Pagan's Mind who shared the stage with Power Quest in their 2006 tour. Fourth was announced as Chris Neighbour from UK thrash metal band FourwayKill. The final guest was announced on the newly redesigned Power Quest website as Bob Katsionis from Greek power metal band Firewind who will provide guest instrumentation on "Save the World".

A series of podcasts from two members of the band has shed more light on the album, its songs and its style. According to those releases Steve Williams had written 17 songs prior to recording but 10 songs including a bonus track are to be on the final release.

Track listing

Japanese bonus track

Band
 Alessio Garavello - lead & backing vocals; rhythm guitar
 Andrea Martongelli - lead & rhythm guitars; backing vocals
 Steve Scott - bass; backing vocals
 Francesco Tresca - drums; backing vocals
 Steve Williams - keyboards; backing vocals

Additional musicians
 Bill Hudson - first guitar solo on #06
 Jørn Viggo Lofstad - second guitar solo on #10
 Richard West - keyboard solo on #02 & keyboard on #11
 Bob Katsionis - first keyboard solo on #07
 Chris Neighbour - guest vocals on #05 & 06

References 

2008 albums
Napalm Records albums
Power Quest albums